Coalvale is an unincorporated community in Crawford County, Kansas, United States.

History
A post office was opened in Coalvale in 1880, and remained in operation until it was discontinued in 1907. The Lewis Coal Company operated a coal mine at Coalvale in the 19th century.

References

Further reading

External links
 Crawford County maps: Current, Historic, KDOT

Unincorporated communities in Crawford County, Kansas
Unincorporated communities in Kansas